Back at the Front (titled Willie and Joe in Tokyo in the UK) is a 1952 American comedy film directed by George Sherman and starring Tom Ewell, Harvey Lembeck and Mari Blanchard, very loosely based on the characters Willie and Joe by Bill Mauldin. It is a sequel to Up Front (1951). Mauldin repudiated both films, and refused his advising fee.

Plot
Willie (Ewell) and Joe (Lembeck) are two U.S. Army veterans of World War II who got through the war by Goldbricking. After returning to civilian life they are recalled to active duty and end up part of the post war occupation forces in Japan. Chaos ensues as they attempt one con job after another in order to avoid work details and get leave to spend time in Tokyo.

Cast
Tom Ewell as Willie 
Harvey Lembeck as Joe  
Mari Blanchard as Nina 
Richard Long as T/Sgt. Rose  
Gregg Palmer as Capt. White 
Barry Kelley as Brig. Gen. Dixon  
Russell Johnson as Johnny Redondo 
Vaughn Taylor as Maj. Lester Ormsby  
 Aram Katcher as  Ben   
 Aen-Ling Chow as Sameko 
 Benson Fong as Rickshaw boy
 Lane Bradford as 	Military Policeman
 Dee Carroll as Night Curse
 David Janssen as Soldier

References

External links
 

1952 films
Universal Pictures films
Military humor in film
American black-and-white films
Films directed by George Sherman
Films based on American comics
Films set in Tokyo
Japan in non-Japanese culture
American comedy films
1952 comedy films
1950s English-language films
1950s American films